One by One is an album by drummer Art Blakey and the Jazz Messengers recorded in 1979 in Italy and released on the Italian Palcoscenico label.

Reception

Allmusic awarded the album 3 stars.

Track listing 
 "Gershwin Medley: Rhapsody in Blue/Summertime/It Ain't Necessarily So/Someone to Watch Over Me/The Man I Love" (George Gershwin) - 8:55    
 "The Song Is You" (Oscar Hammerstein II, Jerome Kern) - 10:30   
 "One by One" (Wayne Shorter) - 9:40   
 "Moanin'" (Bobby Timmons) - 10:50

Personnel 
Art Blakey - drums
Valery Ponomarev - trumpet
Bobby Watson - alto saxophone
David Schnitter - tenor saxophone
James Williams - piano
Dennis Irwin - bass

References 

Art Blakey live albums
The Jazz Messengers live albums
1981 live albums
Palcoscenico Records live albums